In Greek mythology, Eurydice of Pylos (Ancient Greek: Εὐρυδίκη, Eurydikē  "wide justice", derived from ευρυς eurys "wide" and δικη dike "justice) was a Minyan princess as the daughter of King Clymenus of Orchomenus and Budeia, daughter of Lycus. She was the sister of Erginus, Arrhon, Azeus, Pyleus, Stratius and Axia. Eurydice became the queen of Pylos when she married King Nestor, son of Neleus. Their children included Perseus, Peisistratus, Thrasymedes, Pisidice, Polycaste, Stratichus, Aretus, Echephron, and Antilochus.  The wife of Nestor and mother of his children might otherwise have been Anaxibia.

Notes

References 

 Apollodorus, The Library with an English Translation by Sir James George Frazer, F.B.A., F.R.S. in 2 Volumes, Cambridge, MA, Harvard University Press; London, William Heinemann Ltd. 1921. ISBN 0-674-99135-4. Online version at the Perseus Digital Library. Greek text available from the same website.
 Homer, The Odyssey with an English Translation by A.T. Murray, PH.D. in two volumes. Cambridge, MA., Harvard University Press; London, William Heinemann, Ltd. 1919. . Online version at the Perseus Digital Library. Greek text available from the same website.
 Pausanias, Description of Greece with an English Translation by W.H.S. Jones, Litt.D., and H.A. Ormerod, M.A., in 4 Volumes. Cambridge, MA, Harvard University Press; London, William Heinemann Ltd. 1918. . Online version at the Perseus Digital Library
 Pausanias, Graeciae Descriptio. 3 vols. Leipzig, Teubner. 1903.  Greek text available at the Perseus Digital Library.

Princesses in Greek mythology
Queens in Greek mythology
Characters in the Odyssey
Minyan characters in Greek mythology
Nestor (mythology)
Mythology of Pylos